King Phalo kaTshiwo was the king of the AmaXhosa Nation from 1736 until his death in 1775.

King Phalo KaTshiwo (Born:1702-Died:1775) was the second son of King Tshiwo KaNgconde but his older brother Prince Gwali KaTshiwo was from a junior wife and so King Phalo KaTshiwo was in line for the AmaXhosa throne. King Tshiwo KaNgconde died the same year of King Phalo's birth so his uncle Prince Mdange kaNgconde took over the reins as regent. Prince Gwali kaTshiwo joined forces with Prince Ntinde KaTogu , chief of the AmaNtinde clan, to overthrow King Phalo KaTshiwo but was not successful.

King Phalo KaTshiwo had five sons Chief Langa kaPhalo (1705), King Rarabe kaPhalo (1722), King Gcaleka kaPhalo (whose mother, Thandela, was the daughter of the AmaMpondomise monarch King Phahlo and sister to Queen Mamani kaPhahlo.), Prince Lutshaba kaPhalo (1730) and Prince Nukwa kaPhalo.

References

Phalo
1775 deaths
Year of birth unknown